53 Virginis is a single, yellow-white hued star in the zodiac constellation of Virgo. It is faintly visible to the naked eye, having an apparent visual magnitude of 5.04. The star is moving closer to the Sun with a heliocentric radial velocity of −12.7 km/s. It has a relatively high rate of proper motion, traversing the celestial sphere at the rate of  along a position angle of 162.2°.

Gray et al. (2006) assigned this star a stellar classification of F5.5 V, matching an ordinary F-type main-sequence star. Older studies, such as Malaroda (1975) or Eggen (1955), listed a class of F5 III-IV or F6 III-IV, suggesting a more evolved condition. It is spinning with a projected rotational velocity of 13.5 km/s and appears to be undergoing differential rotation. The star is nearly three billion years old, with 1.21 times the mass of the Sun and about three times the Sun's radius. It is radiating over nine times the Sun's luminosity from its photosphere at an effective temperature of around 6,346 K.

The star has three visual companions, the nearest being a magnitude 12.5 star located at an angular separation of  along a position angle of 1°, as of 2000.

References

F-type main-sequence stars
Suspected variables
Virgo (constellation)
Durchmusterung objects
Virginis, 53
114642
064407
4981